The 1982 Copa del Rey Final was the 80th final of the King's Cup. The final was played at Estadio Nuevo José Zorrilla in Valladolid, on 13 April 1982, being won by Real Madrid, who beat Sporting de Gijón 2–1.

Details

References

1983
1981–82 in Spanish football
Real Madrid CF matches
Sporting de Gijón matches
Sport in Valladolid